Murray Guy was a contemporary art gallery specializing in emerging and mid-career contemporary artists. Founded by Margaret Murray and Janice Guy in 1998, the gallery was located in the Chelsea, Manhattan gallery district at 453 West 17th Street. It closed in early 2017 after eighteen years in business.

The gallery covered contemporary photography, video, film, sculpture, and painting.

Founders
Margaret Murray and Janice Guy. Janice Guy (born 1953 in London, UK) a photographer, produced much of her work while studying with Klaus Rinke and Bernd and Hilla Becher at the Kunstakademie Düsseldorf in Düsseldorf, Germany, during the 1970s.. Guy abandoned art-making in the early 1980s, however her photographs re-emerged in 2007 and have been shown in solo exhibitions at White Columns, New York (2008), The Apartment, Vancouver (2008 and 2013), Cleopatra's, New York (2015) and Higher Pictures, New York (2019).

Artists
Among the artists who exhibited at Murray Guy were the following:

Matthew Buckingham.
 Leidy Churchman
 Moyra Davey
 Matthew Higgs
 An-My Lê
 Zoe Leonard
 Rosalind Nashashibi
 Barbara Probst
 Lucy Skaer
 Ann Lislegaard
 Kota Ezawa
 Patricia Esquivias

Further reading
Someone like Me, “‘Contemporary Art Daily”’, March 2, 2014
“Barbara Probst”, “‘New York Times Arts in Review”’, November 21, 2013
“Taking a Load Off, Together”, “‘New York Times Q&A”’, July 24, 2013
“Francis Cape: Utopian Benches”, “‘New York Times Arts in Review”’ July 18, 2013
“Francis Capy: Utopian Benches”. “‘Gallerist”’, July 9, 2013
“Zoe Leonard’s ‘453 West 17th Street’ at Murray Guy”, “‘New York Times Arts in Review”’, October 11, 2012
“Matthew Buckingham”, “‘New York Times Arts in Review”’, December 12, 2003

References

External links
 

Year of establishment missing
Contemporary art galleries in the United States
Art museums and galleries in Manhattan
Culture of Manhattan